Quota may refer to:

Economics 
 Import quota, a trade restriction on the quantity of goods imported into a country
 Market Sharing Quota, an economic system used in Canadian agriculture
 Milk quota, a quota on milk production in Europe

 Individual fishing quota, a quota on allowable catch

Politics 
Gender quota (disambiguation)
Racial quota, numerical requirements for hiring, promoting, admitting or graduating members of a particular racial group
Ticket quota, directives by police departments for their officers to deliver a predetermined number of summons
Quotas in electoral systems

Music and entertainment 

 The Quota (Jimmy Heath album) or the title song, 1961
 The Quota (Red Garland album), an 1973 song.
 Quota (EP), by Eleventyseven, an 2011 song.
 Quota (film) - a 2020 Indian film.

Other
Disk quota, a limit that restricts disk file system usage in computing
 Quota International, a service organization

See also
 Quotaism, the concept of organising society by a quota system